800 Heroes, or Eight-hundred Heroes, may refer to:

 The Defense of Sihang Warehouse, a 1937 constituent battle of the Battle of Shanghai
 "800 Heroes Song", a patriotic Chinese song about the defense of Shihang Warehouse
 800 Heroes (film), a 1976 Hong Kong film about the Defense of Shihang Warehouse; see List of Hong Kong films of 1976
 Eight Hundred Heroes (film), a 1977 Taiwanese film about the Defense of Shihang Warehouse
 The Eight Hundred (2020), a 2020 Chinese film about the Defence of Shihang Warehouse

See also 
 1-800-HERO, a 1998 novel by JoAnn Ross